Simone Francesca Emmanuelle "Frankie" Cuneta Pangilinan (born December 16, 2000), also known by her stage name Kakie, is a Filipina singer-songwriter.

Early life and education
Pangilinan was born to singer-actress Sharon Cuneta and Francis Pangilinan, who would later be elected as senator the following year. She comes from a clan of performing artists and politicians. 

She attended high school at the Beacon Academy in Biñan and is currently taking a college course on literature and anthropology at The New School in New York City.

Career
As an infant and child, Pangilinan (then credited by her nickname Frankie) first appeared in TV commercials with her mother, Sharon Cuneta, including Kimbies, Nido and McDonald's.

In July 2019, Kakie released her first single, "TYL" ("true young lovers"), produced by former Eraserheads frontman, Ely Buendia, who also played the guitar for the track. It gained millions of streams after she performed it on Wish 107.5.

In June 2021, she released her seven-track extended play entitled abOUT hER SPACE, led by the track "afterparty", which is distributed by her record label Curve Entertainment.

References 

2000 births
Living people
Filipino singer-songwriters
21st-century Filipino women singers
Pangilinan family